Robert Rick McCammon (born July 17, 1952) is an American novelist from Birmingham, Alabama. One of the influential names in the late 1970s–early 1990s American horror literature boom, by 1991 McCammon had three New York Times bestsellers (The Wolf's Hour, Stinger, and Swan Song) and around 5 million books in print. Since 2002 he’s written several books in a historical mystery series featuring a 17th-century magistrate’s clerk, Matthew Corbett, as he unravels mysteries in colonial America.

Personal life
His parents are Jack, a musician, and Barbara Bundy McCammon. After his parents' divorce, McCammon lived with his grandparents in Birmingham.  He received a B.A. in Journalism from the University of Alabama in 1974. McCammon lives in Birmingham. He has a daughter, Skye, with his former wife, Sally Sanders.

Career
McCammon has published multiple award-winning books, including Mine in 1990 and Boy's Life in 1991. After the release of Gone South, McCammon chose to leave his publisher. After clashing with an editor at a new publisher over the direction for his historical fiction novel Speaks the Nightbird, he retired from writing. After a long hiatus which resulted from the reorganization of the publishing industry and McCammon's personal depression and soul searching, he returned to the publishing world with Speaks the Nightbird, the first book in the Matthew Corbett series. Publishers Weekly called it a "compulsively readable yarn," and said, "McCammon's loyal fans will find his resurfacing reason to rejoice." Since 2002, fourteen new books have been published, including eight, so far, in the Matthew Corbett series.

In 1985, McCammon's story "Nightcrawlers" was adapted into an episode of The Twilight Zone (1985).

Like Dean Koontz, McCammon for a while refused to let his first novels (up to and including They Thirst) be republished because, while not disliking the books, he did not feel that they were up to the standards of his later works. He wrote that he feels he was allowed to learn how to write in public, and therefore had decided to officially retire his earlier works. However, Baal, Bethany's Sin, The Night Boat, and They Thirst were re-released by Subterranean Press as limited edition novels. In a 2013 interview, McCammon acknowledged that some readers would like to have a complete collection of his work, and said "reading back over those books I find they’re not as poorly written as I recall them to be." They have also all been released as ebooks and audiobooks.

Bibliography 
Baal (1978)
Bethany's Sin (1980) - second published novel, but actually third written
The Night Boat (1980) - third published novel, but actually second written
They Thirst (1981)
Mystery Walk (1983) – first novel published in hardcover
Usher's Passing (1984) - Winner of the 1985 Alabama Library Association Alabama Author Award
Swan Song (1987) - Co-winner of the 1987 Bram Stoker Award and nominated for the 1988 World Fantasy Award for Best Novel; the first of his novels to appear on the New York Times Bestseller List
Stinger (1988) - Nominated for the 1988 Bram Stoker Award for Best Novel; New York Times Bestseller
Blue World (1990) – Short Story Collection; Nominated for the 1989 Bram Stoker Award and the 1990 World Fantasy Award for Best Collection
Mine (1990) - Winner of the 1990 Bram Stoker Award for Best Novel 
Boy's Life (1991) - Winner of the 1991 Bram Stoker Award and the 1992 World Fantasy Award for Best Novel 
Gone South (1992) - Later published in an omnibus edition with Boy's Life.
The Five (2011)
The Border (May 2015)
The Listener (February 2018)

Michael Gallatin books
The Wolf's Hour (1989) - Nominated for the 1989 Bram Stoker Award for Best Novel; New York Times Bestseller
The Hunter from the Woods [Collection] (2011)

Matthew Corbett series 
Speaks the Nightbird (2002) - Later published as two paperback volumes, Judgement of the Witch and Evil Unveiled
The Queen of Bedlam (2007)
Mister Slaughter (2010)
The Providence Rider (2012)
The River of Souls (2014)
Freedom of the Mask (May 2016)
Cardinal Black (April 2019)
The King of Shadows (December 2022)
Leviathan (Forthcoming)

Seven Shades of Evil [Short story collection] (forthcoming)

Trevor Lawson series 
I Travel by Night (2013) - Novella
I Travel by Night 2: Last Train from Perdition (Fall 2016)

References

External links

Robert McCammon's official site
Robert McCammon: Matthew Corbett's World
Robert McCammon @ Facebook
Inkwell Newswatch McCammon Interview

"Corn on Macabre – An Appreciation of Robert McCammon" - Apocalypse Confidential

Writers from Birmingham, Alabama
20th-century American novelists
21st-century American novelists
American horror writers
American male novelists
American Christians
1952 births
Living people
World Fantasy Award-winning writers
20th-century American male writers
21st-century American male writers
Novelists from Alabama